Benjamin Steinberg (1920–1975) was a Botswanan cattle rancher and politician who was the first Treasurer of the Botswana Democratic Party and the first White Botswanan Member of Parliament in 1965.

Born to a prominent Jewish family in Lobatse, Steinberg became a successful trader and rancher in Serowe before he became active in politics. In 1961 he became Treasurer of the newly formed Botswana Democratic Party and later represented the Boteti constituency in the Parliament of Botswana. In 1973 he resigned his post due to the government's decision to sever ties with Israel, a decision to which he objected due to his Jewish heritage.

Steinberg died in South Africa in 1975, after traveling to a hospital in Pietersburg for brain surgery.

References

Botswana people of Jewish descent
Botswana farmers
Jewish politicians
Members of the National Assembly (Botswana)
1920 births
1975 deaths
Date of birth missing
Date of death missing
White Botswana people